The Bay of Whales was a natural ice harbour, or iceport, indenting the front of the Ross Ice Shelf just north of Roosevelt Island, Antarctica. It is the southernmost point of open ocean not only of the Ross Sea, but worldwide.

Discovery and naming
Ernest Shackleton named the feature on January 24, 1908, during the Nimrod Expedition, because of the large number of whales seen near this location.

History
During his quest for the South Pole, Norwegian explorer Roald Amundsen established a temporary base, which he named Framheim, at the Bay of Whales. The base was used between January 1911February 1912, and was named after Amundsen's ship Fram.

The Bay of Whales has also served as a logistical support base for several other important Antarctic expeditions, including:
 1928–1930: Richard Evelyn Byrd – first expedition
 1933–1935: Richard Evelyn Byrd – second expedition
 1939–1941: Richard Evelyn Byrd – third expedition

The configuration of the Bay of Whales is continuously changing. A survey by the second Byrd expedition in 1934 determined that the feature lay at the junction of two separate ice systems, the movements of which are influenced by the presence of Roosevelt Island. Commander Glen Jacobsen, USN, who visited aboard the USS Atka in January 1955, found that calving of the ice shelf rendered the iceport temporarily unusable.

The Bay of Whales was entirely eliminated in 1987 when the  Iceberg B-9 broke off from the Ross Ice Shelf.

The Whale Bay Furrows, a series of undersea valleys on the central Ross continental shelf, were named in association with the Bay of Whales.

See also
 Ice pier
 Atka Iceport
 Erskine Iceport
 Godel Iceport
 Norsel Iceport

References

 

Ports and harbours of the Ross Dependency
Bays of the Ross Dependency